Castle Rock Winery is a winery based within  Geyserville, California.

Background
Established in 1994, by Greg Popovich who is the founder and President, and Chris Noble (COO) is his partner. The winery is run from a small suite of offices in the Palos Verdes Peninsula of California. The wines are produced from grapes grown in Oregon, Washington, and California. All the wines are produced and bottled at the Francis Ford Coppola facility in Sonoma County.

The winemaker is Meghan Rechwho oversees the over 375,000 annual case production. Castle Rock Winery is 44th on their list of the 50 largest in the United States from more than 11,000 in Wine Business Monthly's eighteenth annual ranking by case sales.

Castle Rock Winery was named the best budget brand by the San Francisco Chronicle in 2005 and was among the Value Brands of the Year by Wine & Spirits magazine in 2016.

In January 2022, Castle Rock Winery enlisted Napa Valley Olympic equestrian Sabine Schut-Kery as an ambassador for Dressage, its dressage-inspired collection of wines.

Greg Popovich is a graduate of Pepperdine University (MBA).

References

External links
 

Companies based in Napa County, California
1994 establishments in California
Wineries in California
Wineries in Napa Valley
Food and drink companies established in 1994
American companies established in 1994